Gulf Power Company (GPC) was a U.S. electric utility founded in 1925 and headquartered in Pensacola, Florida. It had over 450,000 customers in 10 counties and 71 towns in northwest Florida, and a generating capacity of 2.278 GW.

GPC was founded in 1925, and was acquired by Juno Beach-based NextEra Energy (the parent company of Florida Power & Light) in 2019. In 2021 GPC was legally merged into Florida Power & Light. NextEra has stated it will operate GPC as a separate company within FPL through 2021. In early 2022 it was absorbed into FPL as its Northwest Florida division.

Overview 
Gulf Power Company was headquartered in Pensacola, Florida, and has a service territory that spans  in 10 counties and 71 towns in northwest Florida. Gulf Power had approximately 465,000 customers in Florida.

Gulf Power served 394,772 retail customers directly and another 14,128 customers through the wholesale delivery of electricity to one investor-owned electric utility and one municipality.

History
Feb. 10, 1925 – Southeastern Power and Light Company – a holding company which operates electric, gas, and street railway systems in Alabama, Georgia and Mississippi – purchases the Pensacola Electric Company.
Oct. 29, 1925 – Gulf Power Company is organized as a Southeastern subsidiary.
Feb. 6, 1926 – Gulf Power Company acquired the Chipley Light and Power Company and becomes a true operating public utility.
Late 1926 – The Pensacola Electric Company merges into Gulf Power after being rescued from receivership by the holding company. Electricity during this period was very unreliable and erratic, and came from about 20 scattered and individually operating units. These generators were designed to supply power to ice plants, lumber yards and electric transit systems. In spite of northwest Florida’s poor economic state, Gulf Power had no choice but to modernize its equipment in order to continue operating.
Sept. 6, 1926 – The Great Miami Hurricane hits Florida with  winds and nine-foot storm surges, destroying nearly 4,000 rotting power poles and extinguishing fires in the old downtown Pensacola generating plant. As a result, more than 600 employees from sister companies work to restore service and install a more modern system. They restore power to the region in record time – within 65 days.
Late 1926 – A 110,000 volt transmission line is built from the northern Alabama/Florida border to Pensacola, Florida – causing the old Allis-Chalmers steam turbine-generator to be placed on standby and therefore ending the era of local power generation. Gulf Power relies on imported energy for the next 39 years, even with an additional 7,366 customers inherited in 1926,  and another 40,000 customers after World War II in the mid 1940s.
1945 – Gulf Power takes the first step toward producing its own electricity by building a 22,000 kW generating unit at the Crist Steam Plant in Pensacola, Florida, to help supply power after years of outages due to war shortages.
2018 – NextEra Energy announces it will acquire Gulf Power from Southern Company. The acquisition was completed in Jan. 2019. 
Jan. 1, 2021 – Gulf Power legally merged into Florida Power & Light. NextEra Energy will operate GPC as a separate division within FPL through 2021.

Generating facilities

Fossil fuel power plants

Community
Gulf Power Company was the largest single taxpayer in northwest Florida. The company’s city, county, state and federal taxes totaled $132.4 million for 2007 – amounting to 10.5 cents out of every dollar earned by the company or $311 per customer. In 2007, the company supported local agencies, chambers of commerce, economic development groups and the United Way as well as other charitable organizations with nearly $1.2 million. Gulf Power employees also contributed more than $80,000 to various philanthropies in northwest Florida.

Environment & Conservation
As of 2011, Gulf Power had reduced its overall plant emissions by 85 percent since 1992, while adding 135,000 customers over that time period.

See also
List of power stations in Florida

References

External links
FPL Northwest Florida division Official Site
NextEra Energy Parent Company

Electric power companies of the United States
NextEra Energy
Energy infrastructure in Florida
Companies based in Pensacola, Florida
American companies established in 1925
American companies disestablished in 2022
Energy companies established in 1925
Non-renewable resource companies established in 1925
1925 establishments in Florida
2022 disestablishments in Florida
Companies formerly listed on the New York Stock Exchange